was a town located in Yame District, Fukuoka Prefecture, Japan.

As of 2003, the town had an estimated population of 4,063 and a density of 68.49 persons per km². The total area was 59.32 km².

On October 1, 2006, Jōyō was merged into the expanded city of Yame.

External links
 Jōyō official website in Japanese

Dissolved municipalities of Fukuoka Prefecture
Populated places disestablished in 2006
2006 disestablishments in Japan